The word "how" is a pop culture anglicization of the Lakota word , a Lakota language greeting by men to men. The term how is often found in stereotypical and outdated depictions of Native Americans, made by non-Natives, in some Hollywood movies and various novels, e.g. those of James Fenimore Cooper or Karl May.

Background 

The Oxford English Dictionary (OED) gives [] ("how") as the pronunciation, and claims Jesuit missionary Jean de Brébeuf had described the use of the term as an interjection of approval with the Wyandot (Hurons). De Brébeuf described individual speakers using Condayauendi Ierhayde cha nonhwicwahachen to signify the end of their speaking, which was answered by the community with a long "Hooow".

Longman Webster describes Howgh as a greeting of the Lakota, Dakota, and/or Nakoda peoples; giving "Háu kola" (Hallo friend) as a Lakota language greeting. However, it would be the only Lakota term using a diphthong and is possibly of external origin. Dakota people and Omaha people use slightly different versions. Francis Parkman, in his book The Oregon Trail, gives a first-person account of three weeks spent hunting buffalo with a band of Oglala Lakota in 1846. He mentions their use of "How". By 1900 "Good morning" was the preferred greeting among Omaha.

Usage 
Karl May, in his works of fiction, used Howgh similar to the Schweizerdeutsch closing particle "Ha gschlosse" (have closed), which is used by the speaker to indicate they are done speaking. In both cases, he used the appropriated term to express a Rule of Order, and a longing for consensus.

"Howgh", "Uff!", Manitou and Lakota "Hoka Hey" have had a major influence on the popular image of Native Americans in German-speaking countries. Howgh gained popularity as a reference to Native Americans through Cooper's and Parkman's books. By 1917 it was so stereotypically accepted that it found its way into US World War I propaganda depicting Native American soldiers:

In 1953 "How" and primitive utterances like "Ugg-a-Wugg!" were used in the lyrics of Walt Disney's songs "What Made the Red Man Red?" and "Indians" in the movie and musical productions of Peter Pan, which featured white actors in stereotypical costumes, performing what they presented as "Indian" dance numbers and singing gibberish. 

Author Raymond Steadman was irritated by the usage of what he viewed as a stereotypical phrase, and closed with  "Reader gettum sick? Have-um enough?"

Howgh also appears in German pop songs depicting stereotypes of Native Americans, such as in "Indianer" by Nena (lyrics by Carlo Karges) and Gus Backus "Da sprach der alte Häuptling der Indianer" ("then spoke the old chieftain of the Indians", covered e.g. by Wildecker Herzbuben and Wirtschaftswunder).

See also
Stereotypes of Indigenous peoples of Canada and the United States
Native Americans in German popular culture
Native Americans in film
List of fictional Native Americans  
Racism

Further reading 
 Wolfgang Hochbruck: "I have spoken." Die Darstellung und ideologische Funktion indianischer Mündlichkeit in der nordamerikanischen Literatur. Gunter Narr Verlag, Tübingen 1991,  (ScriptOralia 32), (Freiburg i. Br., Univ., Diss., 1990).
 Raymond William Stedman: Shadows of the Indian. Stereotypes in American culture. University of Oklahoma Press, Norman OK et al. 1982, .
 April Renae S. Watchman: Howgh!! I have spoken, uff, uff!: Karl May and 19th century representations of American Indians, Thesis (M.A.) – Arizona State University, 2001,

References

Indigenous languages of North America
Native Americans in popular culture
Lakota words and phrases
Greeting words and phrases